The Mahatma Gandhi New Series of banknotes are issued by the Reserve Bank of India (RBI) as the legal tender of the Indian rupee, intended to replace the Mahatma Gandhi Series of banknotes. Announced on 8 November 2016, it followed the demonetisation of 500 and 1000 banknotes of the original Mahatma Gandhi Series. Similar to the preceding series of banknotes, the obverse of the Mahatma Gandhi New Series banknotes also prominently displays the portrait of Mahatma Gandhi. The logo of Swachh Bharat Abhiyan is also printed on the back of the banknotes of this series.

The first banknotes issued in the New Series were the denominations of 500 and 2000, and are in circulation since 10 November 2016. While the 500 note is still being printed, the 2,000 note was last issued dated 2017.  On 13 June 2017, The RBI will soon introduce new INR 50 notes, but the old ones will continue being legal tender. The design is similar to the current notes in the Mahatma Gandhi (New) Series, except they will come with an inset letter 'A'.

The RBI announced on 18 August 2017 that it would "soon" issue a new 50 note. RBI announced the specifications of new 200 rupee note in the Mahatma Gandhi New Series, bearing signature of Dr. Urjit R. Patel, Governor of the Reserve Bank of India on 25 August 2017.

The Reserve Bank of India has also issued 10 denomination banknotes in the Mahatma Gandhi New Series. The new denomination has a motif of the Sun Temple, Konark on the reverse, depicting the country's cultural heritage. The base colour of the note is Chocolate brown.

The RBI announced on 19 July 2018 that it would shortly issue a new 100 note. The new denomination has a motif of the Rani Ki Vav (the Queen's Stepwell), a UNESCO World Heritage site in Patan in Gujarat, India on the reverse, depicting the country's cultural heritage. The base colour of the note is Lavender.

The Reserve Bank of India has announced on 26 April 2019 that it would shortly issue a new 20 note. The new denomination has a motif of Ellora Caves, a UNESCO World Heritage site in Aurangabad district, Maharashtra, India on the reverse, depicting the country's cultural heritage continuing with the theme in the Mahatma Gandhi New Series banknotes.

Security features

The security features of the Mahatma Gandhi New Series banknotes are as follows:

 See-through registration device: Consisting of the numeral denomination at the lower left part of the notes on the front and at the lower right of the notes on the back. Used for the 10, 20, 50, 100, 200, 500 and 2000 notes.

 Novel numbering: A set of six digit serial numbers that increase in size from left to right. These serial numbers are located on the top left and bottom right side on the front of the notes.
 Latent image: Located on the lower left part of the note's front, when tilted, the denomination is seen within the panel near the left side of the portrait of Mahatma Gandhi. Used for the 10, 20, 50, 100, 200, 500 and 2000 notes.
 Denominational numeral: Located on the left side of the front of the notes, the denominational number is rendered in Devanagari script (१०, २०, ५०, १००, २००, ५००, २०००). This raised some controversies.
 Microprinting: Microprinted elements consisting of the letters "RBI" and its corresponding denominations are located on the left side of the note. Used on the 10, 20, 50, 100, 200, 500 and 2000 notes.
 Intaglio printing of the portrait of Mahatma Gandhi.
 Windowed security thread: Located on the front of the notes, the windowed security thread on the 10, 20, 50, 100, 200, 500 and 2000 notes contain colour-shifting elements and inscriptions of India in Hindi. When the notes are tilted, the colour of the security threads changes from green to blue.
 Angular lines: A series of lines placed on both the left and right side of the front of the notes, these angular lines are utilized to help those with visual impairments in identifying the notes. Used on the 100, 200, 500 and 2000 notes.

Banknotes

Languages

Each banknote has its amount written in 17 languages. On the obverse, the denomination is written in English and Hindi. On the reverse is a language panel which displays the denomination of the note in 15 of the 22 official languages of India. The languages are displayed in alphabetical order. Languages included on the panel are Assamese, Bengali, Gujarati, Kannada, Kashmiri, Konkani, Malayalam, Marathi, Nepali, Odia, Punjabi, Sanskrit, Tamil, Telugu and Urdu.

See also

List of artistic depictions of Mahatma Gandhi

References

2016 establishments in India
Memorials to Mahatma Gandhi
Banknotes of India
Portraits on banknotes